Sex & Cigarettes is the eighth studio album by American singer Toni Braxton. It was released on March 23, 2018, by Def Jam Recordings. Her first solo album in eight years, it served as her debut for the label after signing a new record deal. Braxton worked with a variety of producers on the album, including Fred Ball, Antonio Dixon, Kenny "Babyface" Edmonds, Dapo Torimiro, Stuart Crichton, Tricky Stewart, and Pierre Medor. Its release was preceded by the release of two singles, "Deadwood" and "Long as I Live" as well as a remix EP of the song "Coping" which features on the album.

The album received mainly positive reviews from music critics and debuted and peaked at number 22 on the US Billboard 200. It was nominated for three Grammy Awards, including Best R&B Album at the 61st awards ceremony. In promotion of Sex & Cigarettes, Braxton launched her As Long As I Live Tour which began in January 2019 in Northern America, visiting 21 cities, and concluded in United Kingdom in November 2019. It was Braxton's first album to be issued with a Parental Advisory warning, and an edited version was also made available.

Background and recording
Braxton began recording the album in 2016. In contrast to the fast recording of her previous albums, Braxton acknowledged that it took her a second to find her way to the title Sex and Cigarettes. Following her divorce from musician Keri Lewis in 2013, she was still going through a period of self-reflection, and while Braxton felt great about herself, she decided to write her experiences down, looking for an outlet for her emotions. Encouraged by friend and frequent collaborator Babyface who suggested to her to start telling her story, Braxton conceived an album about infidelity, telling Interview  magazine: "I found out about that stuff the hard way, and it left me stronger [...] So this is about love and love gone wrong and trying to fix it and demanding that you make things better and having respect for yourself and demanding to be respected, but at the same time being vulnerable and knowing that love can make you do silly things and it’s okay to be silly."

Soundwise, Braxton was looking for an organic approach during the conceptualization of the album. In the same article with Interview she remarked: "On this album, I said, I’m just gonna let it be organic and let it be indicative of who I am, have fun and be creative. I didn’t want to put myself in a box this time. I’ve been doing this type of music for a long time and I didn’t want it to sound dated." While she reteamed with Babyface and regular producers Daryl Simmons, Antonio Dixon, and Dapo Torimiro, Braxton also consulted several new collaborators to work with her on the album, including Fred Ball, Stuart Crichton, Pierre Medor, and Tricky Stewart. In 2018, she told Us Magazine: “Sex and Cigarettes [is] the next step. I go back to my original work and listen to those songs [...] I’m always pushing the envelope for sexy and for my sound. I think as an artist you have push the envelope even further and that’s what I think I did with this album.”

Promotion
On August 28, 2017, Braxton revealed via her social media she had shot the first music video "Deadwood" for her upcoming album, stating: "Had so much fun shooting @thunderstudios with my BFF @billewoodruff". On September 5, 2017, in an interview with The Insider, Braxton confirmed the title, Sex & Cigarettes, stating: "I feel like I'm older, I wanna say what I feel. I don't wanna be censored". To promote the album, Braxton held a private album listening session in London and also appeared on the daytime show Loose Women to promote the album and the single "Long as I Live". On March 9, 2018, Braxton announced the album was available for pre-order, revealing its cover and track listing of eight songs.

Singles
"Deadwood" was released as the lead single on September 15, 2017. The audio video was released to Braxton's Vevo account on September 13, 2017. The music video was released on Braxton's Vevo account October 6, 2017. On December 2, 2017, the song peaked at number thirty-four on the Billboard R&B/Hip-Hop Airplay chart and spent a total of seventeen weeks on the chart. On December 9, 2017, the song peaked at number seven on the Billboard Adult R&B Songs chart and spent a total of twenty-one weeks on the chart. A remix EP of "Coping" featuring five remixes of the song was released on November 10, 2017. On February 10, 2018, the song reached number one on the Billboard Dance Club Songs chart and has currently spent a total of sixteen weeks on the chart and two weeks at number one.

"Long as I Live" was released as the second single on February 9, 2018. The audio video was released on Vevo on February 8, 2018. It reached no. 1 on US Adult R&B Songs (Billboard) and is the most successful single from this album. In October 2018, "FOH" was announced as the third single from the album. It was serviced to Urban/UAC stations with an edited version.

Critical reception

Sex & Cigarettes received mainly positive reviews from music critics. At Metacritic, which assigns a normalized rating out of 100 to reviews from mainstream critics, the album received an average score of 73, which indicates "generally favorable reviews", based on 6 reviews. 
Ben Beaumont-Thomas of The Guardian gave the album four out of five stars. He wrote that "Braxton may have just got engaged to hip-hop mogul Birdman, but there isn’t any sign of a heel-clicking, lamppost-swinging flush of love here — she seems permanently marooned in a Mariana Trench of post-breakup misery [...] Like Billie Holiday, Braxton’s voice reflexively bends towards sadness, and it continues to do so even when there’s a diamond on her finger." Beaumont-Thomas noted that "a very strong trio of songs open this record" and summed the album as a whole as "exquisitely anguished R&B."

In a positive review, Matt Bauer of Exclaim! wrote that "like Mary J. Blige, pain and heartbreak are inescapably right in Braxton's wheelhouse. So it is with Sex & Cigarettes [...] while not a classic, [the album] is a solid effort from R&B's true queen of heartbreak." AllMusic writer Andy Kellman rated the album three and a half out of five stars and wrote that "the productions, typically polished for a Braxton album, are subtly diverse," ranging from "contemporary country [to] classic Southern soul [and] tropical pop." He found that Braxton delivered "with her distinctive mix of fire and finesse [but] his has more of the former element than any previous Braxton release." Los Angeles Times Mikael Wood gave the album a positive review, stating: "Even in her excitement, though, Braxton's singing — low and smoky, with just the right rawness around the edges — suggests she can sense trouble on the horizon."

Pitchfork editor Claire Lobenfeld concluded that Braxton "is still innately part of R&B’s fabric, even now that her heyday has passed." Songs such as “FOH” are "not a powerhouse single like “He Wasn't Man Enough,” but it’s confirmation that no matter which way pop’s tides turn, Braxton has a way to find her own voice and make it work." Rich Juzwiak, writing for Spin, found that "Braxton’s tunes here rarely warrant her gusto, and the coupling of virtuoso performances with rather mediocre material squares with Sex & Cigarettess larger theme of the dissatisfaction that results from pouring one’s heart into an undeserving relationship. It’s a depressing album, but not quite in the way that’s intended."

Accolades
The album was nominated for three Grammy Awards: Best R&B Performance and Best R&B Song for "Long as I Live", and for Best R&B Album at the 61st Annual Grammy Awards. Braxton won the Outstanding Song – Traditional for Long as I Live at the 50th NAACP Image Awards.

Commercial performance
The album debuted at number 22 on the US Billboard 200 and number 14 on the Top R&B/Hip-Hop Albums chart with 16,000 album equivalent units. The album debuted at number 33 on the UK Albums Chart and number one on the UK R&B Albums Chart.

Track listing

Notes
  signifies a vocal producer
  signifies an additional producer

Personnel
Credits for from AllMusic.

Musicians

 Toni Braxton – primary artist, vocals 
 Colbie Caillat – featured vocals 
 Kwame Ogoo – backing vocals, guitar 
 Cynthia Harrell – background vocals 
 Ben Epstein – bass 
 Earl Harvin – drums 
 Fred Ball – keyboards, percussion
 Paul Boutin – additional percussion, percussion
 Clarissa Farran – string arrangement
 Hilary Skewes – string players contracting
 Antonio Dixon – all keyboard programming, drums, keyboards
 Gary K. Thomas – string playing and arranging
 Water Barnes – bass
 Eric Walls – electric guitar
 Dapo Torimiro – keyboards
Kenny "Babyface" Edmonds – acoustic guitars, keyboards
 Michael O'Neill – acoustic guitar solo
 Michael Ripoll – additional guitars
 Pierre Medor – keyboards, drum programming
C. "Tricky" Stewart – keyboards, drum programming

Production

 Fred Ball – production 
 Antonio Dixon – production 
 Kenny "Babyface" Edmonds – production 
 Dapo Torimiro – production 
 Stuart Crichton – production 
 C. "Tricky" Stewart – production & vocal production 
 Pierre Medor – production 
 Toni Braxton – vocal production 
 Paul Boutin – vocal production

Technical

 Steve Fitzmaurice – recording 
 Jonathan Allen – strings recording 
 Toni Braxton – vocal recording 
 Paul Boutin – vocal recording , engineering , vocals engineering , percussion engineering , mixing 
 Stuart Crichton – recording 
 Sam Thomas – recording 
 William Lovely – recording 
 Preston Reid – assistant engineer 
 Jaycen Joshua – mixing 
 Dave Nakaji – mix assisting 
 Ben Milchev – mix assisting

Charts

Release history

References

2018 albums
Def Jam Recordings albums
Toni Braxton albums